Lemurian or Lemurians or variation, may refer to:

Lemurian Fellowship, a religious movement
Lemurian (album), an album by the artist Lone
 Inhabitants of Lemuria (continent), a hypothetical "lost land" variously located in the Indian and Pacific Oceans
 Lemurians, a hypothetical human root race
 Lemurians, a fictional race of giant lemur relatives from Taylor Anderson's Destroyermen series of books

See also

 Lemuria (disambiguation)
 Lemur (disambiguation)